The Walbunja, also spelt Walbanga and Walbunga, are an Aboriginal Australian people of New South Wales, part of the Yuin nation.

Language
The Walbunja language may be a dialect of Dhurga.

Country
Walbunja Country covers  a region from Cape Dromedary northwards to the vicinity of Ulladulla. Their inland extension is as far as the Shoalhaven River. Braidwood, Araluen and Moruya all lie on what is Walbunja land. The Wandandian peoples lay on their northern boundary, and to their south are the Djiringanj and Thaua.

Alternative names
Alternative spellings include Walbanga and Walbunga.

According to Norman Tindale, alternative names included:
 Thurga (tirga, is the Walbunja word for "no")
 Thoorga
 Bugellimanji (A Walbunja horde)
 Bargalia
 Moruya tribe

Notes

Citations

Sources

Aboriginal peoples of New South Wales